Tangos was a barangay (or district) of Navotas in the Philippines until 2013.
It was divided to Tangos North, Navotas and Tangos South, Navotas on 2013.

References

Navotas
Barangays of Metro Manila